Bradenham is a village and civil parish, a conglomeration of East and West Bradenham, in the English county of Norfolk.

Geography
The civil parish has an area of 16.55 km2 and in the 2001 census had a population of 722 in 301 households, the population decreasing to 700 in 293 households at the 2011 Census. 

For the purposes of local government, the parish falls within the Breckland district.

The River Wissey rises in Bradenham and flows to the west whilst the River Yare rises to the east of Bradenham and flows to the east.

History
Bradenham derives from the Anglo-Saxon for a broad (meaning large) hamlet.

Bradenham is home to St. Mary's Church, a Grade 1 listed building dating back to the Fourteenth Century.

Bradenham Hall was home to the Haggard family for many years and the birthplace of the writer Sir Henry Rider Haggard.

References

External links

Information from Genuki Norfolk on East Bradenham and West Bradenham.

Villages in Norfolk
Civil parishes in Norfolk
Breckland District